Isabel Ferrer Giner (1736-1794), was a Spanish noblewoman and philanthropist. She was a member of a rich noble family who never married but dedicated her life to pious charity, financed by her large personal dowry fortune. She founded and made donations to numerous schools and hospitals in contemporary Catalonia, and was particularly known for her school for girls, where poor girls were taught religion and the profession of sewing in order to support themselves.

References
 « Diccionari Biogràfic de Dones: Isabel Ferrer Giner (Isabel, María, Benita, Ramona, Eugenia, Susana, Joaquina, Josefa, Margarita, Magdalena y Antonia Ferrer Giner )»
 Sanmartí, Montserrat (en premsa). «Burgeses i propietàries». En : Sanmartí, Carme; Sanmartí, Montserrat (eds). Catalanes del IX al XIX. Vic: Eumo.

18th-century Spanish people
1736 births
1794 deaths
Spanish philanthropists
18th-century philanthropists